Horace Sowers Kephart (September 8, 1862 – April 2, 1931) was an American travel writer and librarian, best known as the author of Our Southern Highlanders (a memoir about his life in the Great Smoky Mountains of western North Carolina) and the classic outdoors guide Camping and Woodcraft.

Biography
Kephart was born in East Salem, Pennsylvania, and raised in Iowa.  He was the director of the St. Louis Mercantile Library in St. Louis, Missouri from 1890 to 1903; during these years Kephart also wrote about camping and hunting trips.  Earlier, Kephart had also worked as a librarian at Yale University and spent significant time in Italy as an employee of a wealthy American book collector.

In 1904, Kephart's family (wife Laura and their six children) moved to Ithaca, New York, without him, but Laura and Horace never divorced or legally separated. Horace Kephart found his way to western North Carolina, where he lived in the Hazel Creek section of what would later become the Great Smoky Mountains National Park

I took a topographic map and picked out on it, by means of the contour lines and the blank space showing no settlement, what seemed to be the wildest part of these regions; and there I went. 

Later in life Kephart campaigned for the establishment of a national park in the Great Smoky Mountains with photographer and friend George Masa, and lived long enough to know that the park would be created. He was later named one of the fathers of the national park. He also helped plot the route of the Appalachian Trail through the Smokies.  Kephart died in a car accident in 1931, and was buried near Bryson City, North Carolina, a small town near the area he wrote about in Our Southern Highlanders.  Two months before his death, Mount Kephart was named in his honor.

The Mountain Heritage Center and Special Collections at Hunter Library, Western Carolina University have created a digitized online exhibit called "Revealing an Enigma" that focuses on Horace Kephart's life and works.  This exhibit contains documents and artifacts (photos and maps) that can be browsed or searched.

Ken Burns' multi-part documentary, The National Parks: America's Best Idea, features Horace Kephart in the fourth episode (1920–1933), which was initially broadcast on September 30, 2009.

Kephart is a character in Ron Rash's novel Serena, as well as Walt Larimore's novels, Hazel Creek and Sugar Fork.

Writings

He wrote of his experiences in a series of articles in the magazine Field and Stream. These articles were collected into his first book, Camping and Woodcraft, which was first published in 1906. While mostly a manual of living outdoors, Kephart interspersed his philosophy:

He also published some more books of the same theme such as Camp Cookery (1910) and Sporting Firearms (1912). In addition, he wrote The Hunting Rifle section of Guns, Ammunition and Tackle (New York:  Macmillan, 1904), a volume of Caspar Whitney's prestigious American Sportsman's Library.

Combining his own experience and observations with other written studies, Kephart wrote a study of Appalachian lifestyles and culture called Our Southern Highlanders, published in 1913 and expanded in 1922.

In 1925, Kephart wrote a long editorial explaining why the Smoky mountains should be recognized as a National Park. He later wrote and published a short history of the Cherokee and other books which became standards in the field.

Kephart completed a typescript for a novel in 1929.  However, the book was not edited and published until 2009, when it was published under the title Smoky Mountain Magic by Great Smoky Mountains Association.

Kephart never left the Great Smokies, having been instantaneously killed in a mountain-road automobile accident on April 2, 1931.

See also
Woodcraft

References

External links

 
 
 
Horace Kephart: Revealing an Enigma (from Hunter Library Special Collections, Western Carolina University)
Camping and woodcraft; a handbook for vacation campers and for travelers in the wilderness (1921)
Camping And Woodcraft (1917) | by Horace Kephart, The Macmillan Company
Sporting Firearms (1912)| by Horace Kephart, Outing Publishing Company
Camp Cookery (1910) | by Horace Kephart, Outing Publishing Company

1862 births
1931 deaths
People from Juniata County, Pennsylvania
People from Bryson City, North Carolina
Lebanon Valley College alumni
American travel writers
American librarians
American non-fiction outdoors writers
American male non-fiction writers
Appalachian writers
Great Smoky Mountains National Park
Road incident deaths in North Carolina